Geoff R. Tunbridge (7 April 1932 – 23 March 2015) was an Australian rules footballer who played for the Melbourne Football Club in the Victorian Football League (VFL). At the age of 25, Tunbridge was recruited to Melbourne from Ballarat, where he was an Old Boy (from 1949) and teacher at Ballarat Church of England Boys Grammar School. His jumper was number 23 and he was a red-headed, spearing left-foot flanker.

He originally commenced his footy career for University Blues in the Victorian Amateur Football Association. He began studies in Science at Melbourne University in 1952, and in 1953 entered residence at Trinity College (University of Melbourne), where he also played cricket and tennis.

Tunbridge refused on ideological grounds to accept payment from Melbourne Football Club, as he believed that players should play for the love of the game. The only money he did accept was compensation for the cost of petrol, given the long drive between Ballarat and Melbourne (eight pence/year in his Volkswagen). He also often ate a meat pie half an hour before the game.

Tunbridge earned a nomination on the forward flank for the Melbourne Team of the Century, but this position was ultimately awarded to Garry Lyon. He played in three premierships for Melbourne in the late 1950s.

His formal association with Ballarat Grammar spanned 40 years. He first came to the school as student in 1949 and retired from  teaching at Ballarat Grammar School in 1989. Thereafter, Tunbridge taught at Leibler Yavneh College for a number of years.

Death
Tunbridge died in 2015, aged 82.

References

External links

Profile In DemonWiki

1932 births
2015 deaths
Melbourne Football Club players
University Blues Football Club players
People educated at Trinity College (University of Melbourne)
Australian rules footballers from Ballarat
Melbourne Football Club Premiership players
Three-time VFL/AFL Premiership players